Children of the Arbat is a 16-part television series based on the Children of the Arbat trilogy by Anatoly Rybakov. It aired on the Channel One network in Russia in 2004.

The series closely follows the plot of Rybakov's trilogy. Set in the Soviet Union in the 1930s, it tells the story of Sasha Pankratov (Yevgeny Tsyganov), a student and loyal Komsomol member from the Arbat neighborhood of Moscow who is unfairly exiled to Siberia. As his family and friends, including his love interest Varya Ivanova (Chulpan Khamatova), grapple with Sasha's sudden detention and departure, the series shows the growing fear and paranoia that gripped Moscow in the years before the murder of Sergey Kirov and the start of Stalin's Great Purge.

References

External links
 
  Дети Арбата at RusKino.ru

Russian television films
Channel One Russia original programming
2004 Russian television series debuts
2004 Russian television series endings
2000s Russian television series
Russian drama television series